

509001–509100 

|-id=018
| 509018 Wiese ||  || Tony Wiese (born 1956) has led the Fort Bend Astronomy Club's astronomical outreach efforts for over a decade. Over that time FBAC provided nearly 10% of the total volunteer hours reported to the Astronomical League, an organization that includes over 300 astronomy clubs across the United States. || 
|}

509101–509200 

|-bgcolor=#f2f2f2
| colspan=4 align=center | 
|}

509201–509300 

|-bgcolor=#f2f2f2
| colspan=4 align=center | 
|}

509301–509400 

|-bgcolor=#f2f2f2
| colspan=4 align=center | 
|}

509401–509500 

|-bgcolor=#f2f2f2
| colspan=4 align=center | 
|}

509501–509600 

|-bgcolor=#f2f2f2
| colspan=4 align=center | 
|}

509601–509700 

|-bgcolor=#f2f2f2
| colspan=4 align=center | 
|}

509701–509800 

|-bgcolor=#f2f2f2
| colspan=4 align=center | 
|}

509801–509900 

|-bgcolor=#f2f2f2
| colspan=4 align=center | 
|}

509901–510000 

|-bgcolor=#f2f2f2
| colspan=4 align=center | 
|}

References 

509001-510000